Nanping, historically known as Yanping, is a third-tier prefecture-level city in northwestern Fujian Province, People's Republic of China. It borders Ningde to the east, Sanming to the south, and the provinces of Zhejiang and Jiangxi to the north and west respectively. Part of the famous Bú-î Mountains range is located in this prefecture. Its population was 2,680,645 as of the 2020 census whom 795,448 lived in the built-up (or metro) area made up of Yanping and Jianyang urban districts.

Nanping is a picturesque old city, located on a hill near the fall of the Jianxi Brook into the Min, and surrounded by high stone walls, which were used to prevent artillery fire. They formed a considerable obstacle to anything hostile in past conflicts. The city flower is lily.

Administration
The prefecture-level city of Nanping administers 2 districts, 3 county-level cities and 5 counties.

Yanping District
Jianyang District
Shaowu City
Wuyishan City
Jian'ou City
Shunchang County
Pucheng County
Guangze County
Songxi County
Zhenghe County

Geography and climate

Nanping, similar to the rest of the province, has a humid subtropical climate (Köppen Cfa), with short and mild winters, and long, very hot and humid summers. With monthly percent possible sunshine ranging from 24% in March to 57% in July, the city receives 1,721 hours of bright sunshine annually, with summer being the sunniest time of the year; spring and late winter are especially overcast and damp.

Industry
The industry of Nanping comprises various export-oriented industries. This includes the Fujian Nanping Nanfu Battery Company Ltd. It is the biggest alkaline battery manufacturer and supplier in Chinese mainland.

Sister cities 

 Stamford, Connecticut, United States 2 July 1993
 Albury, New South Wales, Australia 06 Sep. 2003
 Honolulu, Hawaii, United States 12 Jul. 2005 with Wuyishan
 Blue Mountains, New South Wales, Australia 30 Jun. 2009 with Wuyishan
 Sibu, Sarawak, Malaysia 6 Nov., 2014
 Milwaukie, Oregon, United States 23 Aug. 2015
 Milyang, Gyeongsangnam-do, South Korea 15, Jan. 2016
 Opfikon, Zurich, Switzerland May 2016

Notable people
 Hou Yuzhu
 Huang Kaixiang
 Li Qiumei
 Rev. Nathan Sites
 Wu Jingbiao
 Wu Meijin
 Zhang Guozheng
 Yingying Zhang (student who disappeared in the United States)
 Li Ruxin

Image views

See also
Wuyi New Area

References

External links

Government website of Nanping (in Simplified Chinese)

 
Cities in Fujian
Prefecture-level divisions of Fujian